Lucius Calpurnius Piso (also known to contemporaries as Lucius Calpurnius Piso the Augur) (died AD 24) was a Roman senator who was appointed consul in 1 BC as the colleague of Cossus Cornelius Lentulus Gaetulicus. He was also an augur.

Life and career
Calpurnius Piso was a member of the Plebeian gens Calpurnia. He was the son of Gnaeus Calpurnius Piso, consul in 23 BC, and the brother of Gnaeus Calpurnius Piso, the consul in 7 BC. The influence of his brother enabled him to achieve a rapid consulship. Afterwards Calpurnius Piso was appointed the proconsular governor of Asia, possibly around AD 1.

In AD 16, after the treason trial and suicide of Marcus Scribonius Libo, Calpurnius Piso stated his disgust at the corruption of the judicial system. He declared he would leave Rome and live in self-imposed exile until his death. He was persuaded to remain in Rome by the emperor Tiberius. In that same year, he attempted to bring to court Urgulania, an intimate friend of the emperor's mother, Livia. She refused to attend, and took refuge in the palace, while Livia denounced Calpurnius Piso. Tiberius was forced to intervene, and Urgulania was forced to pay a fine.

In AD 20, Calpurnius Piso was one of the advocates who defended his brother who faced treason charges, as his brother had been suspected of having killed Germanicus. Then in AD 24, Piso was brought up on charges of maiestas, but died before his case could come before a court.

An augur, Calpurnius Piso was described as having a ferocious and violent temper, and was a man who spoke his mind to Tiberius. He was married to Statilia.

See also
 List of Roman consuls

References

Sources
 Syme, Ronald, The Augustan Aristocracy (1986). Clarendon Press.

1st-century BC Romans
1st-century Romans
24 deaths
Senators of the Roman Empire
Imperial Roman consuls
Augurs of the Roman Empire
Roman governors of Asia
Year of birth unknown
Calpurnii Pisones